Kohol may refer to:
 Villages in Iran 
 Kohol, Ahar, in Ahar County, East Azerbaijan Province
 Kohol, East Azerbaijan, in Shabestar County, East Azerbaijan Province
 Aghcheh Kohol, in Nir County, Ardabil Province
 Beneh Kohol, in Bostanabad County, East Azerbaijan Province

Other
 Kohol, the local Philippine name for the invasive Golden Apple Snail

See also  
 Kahal (disambiguation)
 Kehel (disambiguation)
 Kohal, Kurdistan, a village in Bijar County, Kurdistan Province 
 Kohl (disambiguation)